Florent Kaouachi (born 9 June 1988) is a French muay thai kickboxer. He is the current ISKA World Super Cruiserweight and former Cruiserweight K-1 champion.

Kickboxing career
Florent Kaouachi made his professional debut against Emmanuel Ulrich at Muay Thai Combat Mania on November 15, 2013, and won the fight by unanimous decision. He was next scheduled to face  Jean-Patrick Capron at Fight Night on December 13, 2013, and won by a fifth-round technical knockout. In his third professional bout, Kaouachi was scheduled to fight Sébastien Laplane for the FDMA National 201 lbs title at Tiger's Thai Fight on June 7, 2014. He won the fight by a first-round technical knockout.

Kaouachi fought Ludovice Providence at Battle 974 on July 26, 2014, and won the fight by a first-round technical knockout. Kaouachi was next scheduled to face Eren Kara at Rond Kok Batay 6 on October 31, 2015, whom he beat by a second-round technical knockout. Kaouachi was scheduled to fight Goye Mohaman for the ISKA Intercontinental Super Cruiserweight Title at K1 Event 9 on November 19, 2016. He won the fight by a fourth-round technical knockout.

Kaouachi participated in a four man tournament, held at K1 Event 10 on February 11, 2017, which was organized to crown the ISKA European Super Cruiserweight K-1 champion. He beat Tomy Blanco by unanimous decision in the semifinals, and Fabien Fouquet by a second-round technical knockout in the finals.

Kaouachi fought Ismael El Brouzini for the ISKA World Cruiserweight K-1 title at K1 Event VIP 3 on April 29, 2017. He won the fight by unanimous decision.

Kaouachi made his Glory debut against Abdarhmane Coulibaly at Glory 47: Lyon on October 28, 2017. He suffered his first professional loss, dropping a split decision to Coulibaly. Kaouachi fought outside of France for the first time in his next fight, being scheduled to face Pavel Voronin at KOK 53 on December 9, 2017, in Chisinau, Romania. The fight was ruled a draw.

Kaouachi was scheduled to fight Cristian Ristea for the vacant ISKA World Super Cruiserweight K-1 championship at K1 Event 11 on February 24, 2018. He won the fight by a fourth-round technical knockout.

Kaouachi was scheduled to face Ahmed Karoucha at Xtreme Fight Dionysien on June 16, 2018. He won the fight by unanimous decision.

Kaouachi made his ONE Championship debut against Sergei Maslobojev at One Championship: Pursuit of Power on July 13, 2018. Maslobojev won the fight by unanimous decision.

Kaouachi was scheduled to face Valery Bizyaev at Tatneft Cup on June 11, 2019. He lost the fight by unanimous decision. Kaouachi rematched Tomy Blanco at BLR Fight Sauvagerie 5 on November 30, 2019. He won the fight by unanimous decision.

Kaouachi was scheduled to face Sunday Asibor K-1 Event 14 on December 4, 2021, following a two-year layoff from the sport. He won the fight by decision.

Kaouachi was booked to face Kambiz Abdollahi at Cicada Fight Championship on May 21, 2022, in Dubai, United Arab Emirates, his first fight outside of France.

Kaouachi made his second appearance under the Glory banner against Luis Tavares at Glory Rivals 2 on June 11, 2022. He lost the fight by a third-round knockout. The result was overturned to a no contest on November 24, as Tavares tested positive for a banned substance.

After suffering his second loss under the Glory banner, Kaouachi was expected to face Mimoun Jazouli at K-1 Event Gold Edition on July 2, 2022. This fight was later cancelled, and Kaouachi was instead booked to make a ISKA World Cruiserweight K-1 title defense against Adam Krzysztof at BLR Fight 6 on November 26, 2022. He retained the title by unanimous decision.

Championships and accomplishments

Kickboxing
 International Sport Karate Association
 ISKA World K-1 Super Cruiserweight (-95 kg) Championship
 ISKA World K-1 Cruiserweight (-88.5 kg) Championship
 ISKA Intercontinental K-1 Super Cruiserweight (-95 kg) Championship
 ISKA European K-1 Super Cruiserweight (-95 kg) Championship

Muay Thai
 Fédération de Muaythaï et Disciplines Associées
 FDMA National 201 lbs Championship
International Federation of Muaythai Associations
 2014 IFMA European Championships (-91 kg)
World Muaythai Federation
 2016 WMF World Championships (-91 kg)

Fight record

|-  bgcolor="#CCFFCC"
| 2022-11-26 || Win ||align=left| Adam Krzysztof || BLR Fight 6 ||  Saint-Denis, Réunion || Decision (Unanimous) || 5 || 3:00 || 15–3–1 (1) 
|-
! style=background:white colspan=9 |
|-
|-  bgcolor="#c5d2ea"
| 2022-06-11 || NC ||align=left| Luis Tavares || Glory Rivals 1 ||  Alkmaar, Netherlands || KO (Left hook) || 3 || 0:27 || 14–3–1 (1) 
|-
! style=background:white colspan=9 |
|-
|-  bgcolor="#CCFFCC"
| 2021-12-04|| Win ||align=left| Sunday Asibor || K-1 Event 14, Tournament Reserve Fight || Troyes, France || Decision || 3 || 3:00 || 14–3–1
|-  bgcolor="#CCFFCC"
| 2019-11-30|| Win||align=left| Tomy Blanco || BLR Fight Sauvagerie 5 || Reunion, France || Decision (Unanimous) || 3 || 3:00|| 13–3–1
|-  bgcolor="#FFBBBB"
| 2019-06-11|| Loss||align=left| Valery Bizyaev || Tatneft Cup || Kazan, Russia || Decision (Unanimous) || 3 || 3:00|| 12–3–1
|-  bgcolor="#FFBBBB"
| 2018-07-13|| Loss||align=left| Sergei Maslobojev || One Championship: Pursuit of Power || Kuala Lumpur, Malaysia || Decision (Unanimous) || 3 || 3:00|| 12–2–1
|-  bgcolor="#CCFFCC"
| 2018-06-16|| Win ||align=left| Ahmed Karoucha || Xtreme Fight Dionysien || Reunion, France || Decision (Unanimous) || 3 || 3:00|| 12–1–1
|-  bgcolor="#CCFFCC"
| 2018-02-24|| Win ||align=left| Cristian Ristea || K1 Event 11 || Troyes, France || TKO || 4 || 3:00|| 11–1–1
|-
! style=background:white colspan=9 |
|-
|-  bgcolor="#c5d2ea"
| 2017-12-09|| Draw||align=left| Pavel Voronin || KOK 53 || Chisinau, Romania || Decision || 3 || 3:00|| 10–1–1
|-  bgcolor="#FFBBBB"
| 2017-10-28|| Loss||align=left| Abdarhmane Coulibaly || Glory 47: Lyon || Lyon, France || Decision (Split) || 3 || 3:00|| 10–1
|-  bgcolor="#CCFFCC"
| 2017-04-29|| Win||align=left| Ismael El Brouzini || K1 Event VIP 3 || Troyes, France || Decision (Unanimous) || 3 || 3:00|| 10–0
|-
! style=background:white colspan=9 |
|-
|-  bgcolor="#CCFFCC"
| 2017-04-07|| Win||align=left| Mickael Yapi || Fight Night 1 || Saint-Étienne, France || Decision (Unanimous) || 3 || 3:00|| 9–0
|-  bgcolor="#CCFFCC"
| 2017-02-11|| Win||align=left| Fabien Fouquet || K1 Event 10, Tournament Final || Troyes, France || TKO || 2 || 3:00|| 8–0
|-
! style=background:white colspan=9 |
|-
|-  bgcolor="#CCFFCC"
| 2017-02-11|| Win||align=left| Tomy Blanco || K1 Event 10, Tournament Semifinal || Troyes, France || Decision (Unanimous) || 2 || 3:00|| 7–0
|-  bgcolor="#CCFFCC"
| 2016-11-19|| Win||align=left| Goye Mohaman || K1 Event 9 || Troyes, France || TKO || 4 || 3:00|| 6–0
|-
! style=background:white colspan=9 |
|-
|-  bgcolor="#CCFFCC"
| 2015-10-31|| Win||align=left| Eren Kara || Rond Kok Batay 6 || Sainte-Marie, Martinique || TKO || 2 || 3:00|| 5–0
|-  bgcolor="#CCFFCC"
| 2014-07-26|| Win||align=left| Ludovice Providence || Battle 974 || Reunion, France || TKO || 1 || 3:00|| 4–0
|-  bgcolor="#CCFFCC"
| 2014-06-07|| Win||align=left| Sébastien Laplane || Tiger's Thai Fight || Le Pradet, France || TKO || 1 || 3:00|| 3–0
|-
! style=background:white colspan=9 |
|-
|-  bgcolor="#CCFFCC"
| 2013-12-13|| Win||align=left|  Jean-Patrick Capron || Fight Night || Reunion, France || TKO || 5 || 3:00|| 2–0
|-  bgcolor="#CCFFCC"
| 2013-11-15|| Win||align=left|  Emmanuel Ulrich || Muay Thai Combat Mania || Pattaya, Thailand || Decision (Unanimous) || 3 || 3:00|| 1–0
|-
| colspan=9 | Legend:    

|-  style="background:#cfc"
| 2016-03-22 || Win ||align=left|  || 2016 WMF World Championships, Tournament Final || Bangkok, Thailand || Decision || 3 || 2:00
|-
! style=background:white colspan=9 |
|-
|-  style="background:#fbb"
| 2014-09 || Loss ||align=left| Arkadiusz Wrzosek || 2014 IFMA European Championships, Tournament Final || Poland || TKO (Injury) || 2 || 2:00
|-
! style=background:white colspan=9 |
|-
|-  style="background:#cfc"
| 2014-09 || Win||align=left| Robert Grguric || 2014 IFMA European Championships, Tournament Semifinal || Poland || KO (Left hook) || 1 || 1:30
|-
|-  style="background:#cfc"
| 2014-03-30 || Win ||align=left| Jason Quitusia || 2014 FDMA IFMA Qualifiers, Tournament Final || Paris, France || Decision || 3 || 2:00
|-
! style=background:white colspan=9 |
|-
|-  style="background:#cfc"
| 2013-09-07 || Win ||align=left| Robert Sylvert || Millennium Team Fight || Paris, France || TKO (Retirement) || 1 || 3:00
|-
| colspan=9 | Legend:

See also
 List of male kickboxers

References 

1988 births
Living people
French male kickboxers
French Muay Thai practitioners
ONE Championship kickboxers
Sportspeople from Paris